Lake Istokpoga is a  freshwater lake in Highlands County, Florida. It is fed by two creeks, Arbuckle Creek and Josephine Creek. It is considered the fifth largest lake in the state of Florida. Despite its area, it is very shallow, with an average depth of only . As a result, boaters must be cautious to not become stranded in muck near the shore line. Bass and pontoon boats are the most commonly used watercraft, with some use of airboats. With such shallowness, this lake is extremely dangerous for boaters during windstorms, as the waves get quite high.

Boating and fishing are popular activities at this lake. There are at least half a dozen fish camps on Lake Istokpoga.  Several of these fish camps book visitors for fishing trips and they also have cabins and hook up for campers, for overnight stays.  The amenities on the lake are 5 public boat ramps and 2 public parks, one on the lake's north side and the other on the south east corner.  Most of the shoreline is undeveloped and there are two islands, Big and Bumble Bee, in the lake's interior.  Some residential properties and private boat docks and beaches dot areas on the shore.

Local legend is that the word Istokpoga is of the Seminole language meaning "a lake where someone was killed in the water" because a group of Seminole Indians attempted to cross the lake and were bogged in the mire and swallowed by whirlpools.

Lake Istokpoga serves as a home for the snail kite.

References

External links
 Florida Lakewatch
 Friends of Istokpoga
 Lakes Online

Lakes of Highlands County, Florida
Lake Okeechobee
Lakes of Florida